Bhairab Bazar Junction railway station is a railway junction located in Bhairab, Kishoreganj District, Bangladesh. At least 3000 passengers use this railway junction regularly.

History
In 1892, the company named Assam Bengal Railway formed in England. It took responsibility for the construction of railways in the eastern Bengal. On 1 July 1895, the Chittagong–Comilla and the Laksam–Chandpur lines were opened. In 1896, Comilla–Akhaura–Shahbajpur railway was established. In 1903, the Laksam–Noakhali railway branch line was started under the management of the Assam Bengal Railway. The line was acquired by the government of British Raj in 1905, and amalgamated with the Assam Bengal Railway on 1 January 1906. The Tongi–Bhairab–Akhaura line was laid between 1910 and 1914.

References

External link
 

Railway stations in Dhaka Division
Railway junction stations in Bangladesh
Railway stations opened in 1914